Marie Gisèle Eleme Asse (born 13 November 1995) is a Cameroonian sprinter She won two medals at the 2017 Jeux de la Francophonie.

International competitions

1Did not start in the semifinals

Personal bests

Outdoor
100 metres – 11.59 (-0.8 m/s, Abidjan 2017)
200 metres – 24.28 (+0.8 m/s, Brazzaville 2015)

References

1995 births
Living people
Cameroonian female sprinters
Athletes (track and field) at the 2015 African Games
Athletes (track and field) at the 2018 Commonwealth Games
Sportspeople from Yaoundé
Commonwealth Games competitors for Cameroon
African Games competitors for Cameroon
Islamic Solidarity Games competitors for Cameroon
21st-century Cameroonian women